Finsbury Park is a public park in the London neighbourhood of Harringay. It is in the area formerly covered by the historic parish of Hornsey, succeeded by the Municipal Borough of Hornsey. It was one of the first of the great London parks laid out in the Victorian era. The park borders the neighbourhoods of Harringay, Finsbury Park, Stroud Green, and Manor House.

History

Before the park
The park was landscaped on the northeastern extremity of what was originally a woodland area in the Manor or Prebend of Brownswood. It was part of a large expanse of woodland called Hornsey Wood that was cut further and further back for use as grazing land during the Middle Ages. In the mid-18th century a tea room had opened on the knoll of land on which Finsbury Park is situated. Londoners would travel north to escape the smoke of the capital and enjoy the last remains of the old Hornsey Wood. Around 1800 the tea rooms were developed into a larger building which became known as the Hornsey Wood House/Tavern. A lake was also created on the top of the knoll with water pumped up from the nearby New River. There was boating, a shooting and archery range, and probably cock fighting and other blood sports. The Hornsey Wood Tavern was demolished in the process of making the area into a park, but the lake was enlarged. Once the park had opened, a pub across the road from its eastern entrance along Seven Sisters Road called itself the Hornsey Wood Tavern after the original. This pub was later renamed the Alexandra Dining Room and closed for business in April 2007. It was subsequently demolished.

Creation of the park
During the early part of the second quarter of the 19th century, following developments in Paris, Londoners began to demand the creation of open spaces as an antidote to the ever-increasing urbanisation of London. In 1841 the people of Finsbury on the northern perimeter of the City of London petitioned for a park to alleviate conditions of the poor. The present-day site of Finsbury Park was one of four suggestions for the location of a park.

Originally to be named Albert Park, the first plans were drawn up in 1850. Renamed Finsbury Park, plans for the park's creation were ratified by an Act of Parliament in 1857. Despite some local opposition, the park was opened in 1869.

During the wars

During the First World War the park was known as a location for pacifist meetings.

During the Second World War, the park was used as military training grounds and also hosted anti-aircraft guns.

Regeneration

Through the late 20th Century the park began to fall into a state of disrepair with most of the original features gone by the 1980s. This decline was worsened in 1986 when the then owner, Greater London Council, was wound up and ownership was passed on to Haringey Council, but without sufficient funding or a statutory obligation for the park's upkeep.

A £5 million Heritage Lottery Fund Award, made in 2003, enabled significant renovations including cleaning the lake, building a new cafe and children's playground and resurfacing and repairing the tennis courts. The park now contains tennis courts, a running track, a softball field and many open spaces for various leisure activities.

Facilities
The park has a mixture of open ground, formal gardens, avenues of mature trees and an arboretum. There is also a lake, a children's play area, a cafe and an art exhibition space. Sports facilities in the park include football pitches, a cycling club, a bowling green, a skatepark, an athletics stadium, and tennis and basketball courts. Unusually for London, the park hosts two facilities for "American" sports: an American football field, home to the London Blitz, and diamonds for softball and baseball, home to the London Mets.

The Parkland Walk provides a pedestrian and cycle route that links the park with Crouch Hill Park, Crouch End, and Highgate Underground station.

Culture

Live music

The park has hosted several live music performances and music festivals including: Fleadh Festival (1990–2003), Great Xpectations Festival (1993), Rise Festival (2006–2010) and Wireless Festival (2014–2019, 2022–).

Over the 2010s, the number of live festivals increased as local council finances became stretched; this sometimes damaged grass as well as denying local access to part of the park for a few days. Local MP David Lammy went as far as to say: "There are parts of the park that look like the Serengeti—a bald dust bowl where there was once grass."

Friends group, The Friends of Finsbury Park, unsuccessfully took Haringey Council to the High Court, in a bid to stop large live music events. "The group had contended the council had no right to grant the festival permission under the Greater London Parks and Open Spaces Act 1967, claiming Haringey’s actions were unlawful because the event shuts off 27 per cent of the park when the maximum permitted by legislation is 10 per cent." They lost the case but the decision made clear that the council held Finsbury Park in trust, and that any funds raised in the park from events must be used in the park. This has influenced the number of events in recent years, as well contributed to investments in the park (e.g., new playgrounds, refreshing the Richard Hope play space).

Filming
Finsbury Park has been used as a filming location for music videos such as Groove Armada's "Song 4 Mutya", feature films such as Rachid Bouchareb's London River and TV programmes such as Silent Witness.

References

Parks and open spaces in the London Borough of Haringey
Bowling greens in England
Harringay
American football venues in the United Kingdom
Baseball venues in the United Kingdom